Planet Ring may refer to:

 Planet Ring (video game), a 2000 SEGA Dreamcast game
 Planetary ring or ringed planet, an astronomical phenomenon

See also
 Orbital ring, a speculative mega-structure